The district of Oldenburg (German: Landkreis Oldenburg, not to be confused with the cities of Oldenburg and Oldenburg in Holstein) is a district in the state of Lower Saxony, Germany. It is bounded by (from the east and clockwise) the districts of Diepholz, Vechta, Cloppenburg and Ammerland, the city of Oldenburg, the district of Wesermarsch and the city of Delmenhorst.

History

The district of Oldenburg was established in 1933. Until 1988 the administrative seat was in the city of Oldenburg. Since then the capital has been in Wildeshausen.

Geography

The district is located between the metropolitan areas of Oldenburg and Bremen. The Hunte River runs through the district from south to north.

Coat of arms

Towns and municipalities

References

External links

 Official website (German)

 
Districts of Lower Saxony